Fogging may refer to:

Distance fog, a technique used in 3D computer graphics
Fogging (photography), adverse impacts in photography
Fogging (censorship), a technique for visual censorship
Anti-fog, substance to prevent fogging of surfaces like glass and plastic
Fogging (assertiveness), an assertiveness technique
Electronic cigarette smoking, or fogging 
Fogging (insect control), spraying of pesticides via a fog-like mist for insect control or for collecting them for study
Fog computing, architecture that uses collaborative end-user clients to carry out storage and communication

See also
Fog (disambiguation)